The 2012 Asian Men's Club Volleyball Championship was the 13th staging of the AVC Club Championships. The tournament was held in Shanghai, China.

Pools composition
The teams are seeded based on their final ranking at the 2011 Asian Men's Club Volleyball Championship.

''* Withdrew

Preliminary round

Pool A

|}

|}

Pool B

|}

|}

Pool C

|}

|}

Pool D

|}

|}

Classification 13th–15th

Semifinals

|}

13th place

|}

Classification 9th–12th

Semifinals

|}

11th place

|}

9th place

|}

Final round

Quarterfinals

|}

5th–8th semifinals

|}

Semifinals

|}

7th place

|}

5th place

|}

3rd place

|}

Final

|}

Final standing

Awards
MVP:  Salvador Hidalgo (Al-Arabi)
Best Scorer:  Christian Pampel (Al-Arabi)
Best Spiker:  Shahram Mahmoudi (Kalleh)
Best Blocker:  Adel Gholami (Kalleh)
Best Server:  Salvador Hidalgo (Al-Arabi)
Best Setter:  Saeed Juma Al-Hitmi (Al-Arabi)
Best Libero:  Tong Jihua (Shanghai)

References

External links
Asian Volleyball Confederation

2012 Asian Men's Club Volleyball Championship
Asian Men's Club Volleyball Championship
Asian Men's Club Volleyball Championship
2011 Asian Men's Club Volleyball Championship